Probable G-protein coupled receptor 123 is a protein that in humans is encoded by the GPR123 gene. It is a member of the adhesion-GPCR family of receptors. Family members are normally characterized by an extended extracellular region with a variable number of protein domains coupled to a TM7 domain via a domain known as the GPCR-Autoproteolysis INducing (GAIN) domain.

References

Further reading

G protein-coupled receptors